The UC Santa Barbara Gauchos college football team represented University of California, Santa Barbara. The Gauchos competed in the California Collegiate Athletic Association (CCAA) from 1939 to 1962. In 1969, the team moved to the NCAA University Division, but dropped football after the 1971 season. A student-run team was fielded in 1984 and 1985, and then an NCAA Division III team was fielded from 1986 to 1991.

The program had 13 head coaches in its 55 years of existence, including one who had two tenures. The team played as a student-run "club team" from 1983 to 1985, and games from those years do not count as official NCAA games.

Coaches

References

UC Irvine Anteaters men's coaches

UC Santa Barbara Gauchos football